Mark McLeod (born 15 December 1986) is an English football midfielder who plays for  club Consett.

He made six appearances for Darlington in the Football League, played in Sweden for Östavalls IF, and his other non-league clubs include Harrogate Town, Durham City, Workington, Newcastle Blue Star, Sunderland RCA, Walton & Hersham, Chipstead, Harrow Borough, Aylesbury, Northwood, Uxbridge, Hebburn Town and Seaham Red Star.

Life and career
McLeod was born in Sunderland. He began his football career with Darlington, and captained their youth team. He spent time on loan to Harrogate Town of the Conference North and to Northern League club Durham City before making his first-team debut for Darlington on 18 March 2006, replacing Jonjo Dickman after 80 minutes of a 5–0 home defeat against Carlisle United in League Two. He made what the Evening Gazette described as "an impressive full debut" two weeks later as Darlington beat Lincoln City 4–2. He signed a professional contract at the end of the season. He played four matches in the first couple of months of the 2006–07 season, and then spent time on loan with another Conference North club, Workington.

McLeod was not retained for 2007–08, and he and former Darlington teammate Richard Logan played in Sweden for lower-league club Östavalls IF. On his return, he joined Newcastle Blue Star, managed by Tommy Cassidy for whom he had played at Workington, while completing his A-Levels at South Tyneside College. He went on to take a degree in economics at York University, and played for the university football team, and for Sunderland RCA of the Northern League when his studies allowed.

After graduating, McLeod worked in London as a civil servant in the Cabinet Office. A friend suggested he resume playing football on a part-time basis, and he joined Walton & Hersham of the Isthmian League Division One South. He moved on to Isthmian League clubs Chipstead and Harrow Borough, from where he spent brief spells on loan at Aylesbury, while recovering from injury in September 2016, and at Northwood. He then spent two pandemic-interrupted seasons with another Isthmian League club, Uxbridge, before returning to the north-east of England.

McLeod signed for Northern Premier League Division One East club Hebburn Town for the 2021–22 season. He made nine league appearances before joining Northern League club Seaham Red Star on a month's loan, later extended to three months, after which he made a further nine appearances before his Hebburn contract expired. McLeod returned to the Northern Premier League with Consett for the 2022–23 season.

Style of play
McLeod described himself in 2015 as "a sitting midfielder, not really a box-to-box type. I'm good at breaking up play, but I don't play football just to run around and make tackles. I do like to get on the ball and play a bit as well, so the part where we actually have the ball is my favourite bit." In contrast, his Harrow Borough manager, Steve Baker, signed him to "bring physicality. He can play, too, which is great, but he can put his foot in, he's physical and every other team seems to have one like that, so we want one here." Six years later, he assessed his style as "simple: keeping the ball, battling for headers and winning tackles in the middle. I'm not too fussed about the attacking side of the game, as long I can help prevent opposition goals as much as possible."

Career statistics

References

External links
 

1986 births
Living people
Footballers from Sunderland
English footballers
Association football midfielders
Darlington F.C. players
Harrogate Town A.F.C. players
Durham City A.F.C. players
Workington A.F.C. players
Newcastle Blue Star F.C. players
Walton & Hersham F.C. players
Chipstead F.C. players
Harrow Borough F.C. players
Aylesbury F.C. players
Northwood F.C. players
Uxbridge F.C. players
Seaham Red Star F.C. players
Consett A.F.C. players
English Football League players
Northern Football League players
National League (English football) players
Isthmian League players
Southern Football League players
Northern Premier League players
York University alumni